The 1996–97 Football League Cup (known as the Coca-Cola Cup for sponsorship reasons) was the 37th Football League Cup, a knockout competition for England's top 92 football clubs.

The tournament was won by Leicester City, who beat Middlesbrough 1–0 in the final replay at Hillsborough after finishing 1–1 at Wembley Stadium.

First round
66 of the First, Second and Third Division clubs competed from the First Round. Each section was divided equally into a pot of seeded clubs and a pot of unseeded clubs. Clubs' rankings depended upon their finishing position in the 1995–96 season.

First leg

Second leg

Second round
The 33 winners from the First Round joined the 15 Premier League clubs not participating in European competition plus the 3 non-promoted play-off teams from the First Division and the 3 relegated clubs from the Premier League in the 1995–96 season in Round Two. First leg matches were played on the 17 and 18 September, second leg matches were played on 24 and 25 September.

First Leg

Second Leg

Third round
The 27 winners from the Second Round joined the five Premiership clubs participating in European competition in Round Three. Matches were played on 22 and 23 October.

Ties

Replays

Fourth round
Most matches were played on 26 November 27 November with two replays being played on 18 December.

Replays

Quarter-finals
The four matches were played between 8 and 29 January.

Replay

Semi-finals
The semi-final draw was made in January 1997 after the conclusion of the quarter finals. Unlike the other rounds, the semi-final ties were played over two legs, with each team playing one leg at home. The first leg matches were played on 18 and 26 February 1997, the second leg matches were played on 11 and 12 March 1997. Leicester City went through on away goals to reach their first cup final in 28 years at the expense of Wimbledon, while Division Two underdogs Stockport gave Middlesbrough a run for their money, going out by a single goal.

First leg

Second leg

Leicester City win on away goals

Middlesbrough win 2–1 on aggregate

Final

The 1997 Coca-Cola Cup Final was played on 6 April 1997 and was contested between Leicester City and Middlesbrough at Wembley Stadium. Leicester won 1–0 in the replay at Hillsborough on 16 April 1997. This was the last year that the Football League Cup Final was decided by a replay.

Replay

References

External links
Official Carling Cup website
Carling Cup at bbc.co.uk
League Cup news, match reports and pictures on Reuters.co.uk
Results on Soccerbase

1996–97
Cup
1996–97 domestic association football cups
Lea